A frying pan is a pan used for cooking, also known as a skillet.  Frying pan may also refer to:

Places
Frying Pan, North Carolina, an unincorporated community in Tyrell County, North Carolina
Frying Pan Farm Park, a park in Fairfax County, Virginia
Frying Pan Shoals, off the coast of Cape Fear, North Carolina
Fryingpan Glacier, on Mount Rainier in the state of Washington
Fryingpan River, in Colorado

Other uses
Frying pan (guitar), an early guitar
Frying pans, Bronze Age Cycladic archaeological artifacts found in the Aegean Islands, including:
Frying pan (Karlsruhe 75/11), stone, at the National Archaeological Museum of Athens, Greece
Frying pan (NAMA 4974), ceramic, at the National Archaeological Museum of Athens, Greece
Frying pan (Paros 2136), ceramic, at the National Archaeological Museum of Athens, Greece
Frying pans (flower), Eschscholzia lobbii, a species of poppy
"The Frying Pan", an informal Australian name for the constellation Chamaeleon
"Frying Pan", a 1995 song by The Urge from the album Receiving the Gift of Flavor

See also
 Fry (disambiguation), for other uses of "fry" or "frying"